The following is a list of the Teen Choice Award winners and nominees for Choice TV Actor - Comedy.

Winners and nominees

2000s

2010s

References

Comedy Actor